Fossa ovalis ("oval-shaped depression") can refer to:
 Fossa ovalis (thigh), also called the saphenous opening
 Fossa ovalis (heart), an embryonic remnant of the foramen ovale

See also
 Fossa (disambiguation)
 Ovalis (disambiguation)